Babbacombe Model Village is a miniature village and railway located in Babbacombe in Torquay, Devon.

The model village was opened in 1963 by Tom & Ruth Dobbins, who had previously opened another model village at Southport in 1957.

Miniature landscape 

The site is set on approximately 4 acres (1.6 ha). There are over 400 models along with 1,000 ft (300 m) of model train track in the village. The model village is primarily one town, an entirely fictional one, but many buildings within them are based on UK prototypes and landmarks (including Stonehenge and the Shard).

Names of shops and other features include humorous puns, such as Marks and Sparks, Woolies, Amanda Lofe - Home Baked Bread & Cakes, Ivor Faggot Butcher ('I've a faggot' - a reference to the traditional English meat dish), A. Kingbody Sports Centre ('Aching Body') and Terry Bull Gardening Service, Decorators ('Terrible').

The village also includes a model railway, castle and windmill.

Popular models
Some of the popular models at the village include the burning house, Stonehenge, the Shard, the EastEnders indoor scene and the dragon castle.

Media
The model village appeared in an episode of Holiday of My Lifetime in 2014 with Len Goodman and Matt Allwright. It also appeared on The One Show in the same year.
In 2019, the model village was used as a filming location for Don’t Forget the Driver.

Illuminations
In summer months, the Babbacombe Model Village is open until 10.30pm, weeknights with the village illuminations switched on. The Shard in the centre of the village is also lit up.

References

External links 
Babbacombe Model Village website
Babbacombe Model Village at Devon Online

1963 establishments in England
Gardens in Devon
Miniature parks
Tourist attractions in Devon
Torquay